During the first five years of the People's Republic of China (1949 to 1954), the Central People's Government of the People's Republic of China served as supreme organ for exercising state power when the National People's Congress was not in session, as determined by the Chinese People’s Political Consultative Conference.

Since 1954, the Central People's Government has been synonymous with the State Council of the People's Republic of China. The term Central People's Government is still used in Mainland agencies in Special Administrative Regions of Hong Kong and Macau.

Organizational structure 
The Central People's Government was then composed of:

 Ministries of the Central People's Government
 People's Revolutionary Military Committee of the Central People's Government()
 Supreme People's Court of the Central People's Government()
 Supreme People's Procuratorate of the Central People's Government()
 State Planning Commission of the Central People's Government (1952–1954)()

See also 

 The "Central People's Government" since 1954: State Council of the People's Republic of China

Seal of the People's Government of the People's Republic of China

References

External links 
 

Government of China
1949 establishments in China